

454001–454100 

|-bgcolor=#f2f2f2
| colspan=4 align=center | 
|}

454101–454200 

|-bgcolor=#f2f2f2
| colspan=4 align=center | 
|}

454201–454300 

|-bgcolor=#f2f2f2
| colspan=4 align=center | 
|}

454301–454400 

|-id=326
| 454326 Donlee ||  || Don Lee (born 1949) is a material scientist at Teledyne Imaging Sensors who has played a critical role in the development of high performance HgCdTe infrared detectors that have enabled a generation of scientific facilities, including the Hubble Space Telescope, WISE, the Mars Reconnaissance Orbiter and New Horizons. || 
|-id=329
| 454329 Ericpiquette ||  || Eric Piquette (born 1971) is a material scientist at Teledyne Imaging Sensors who has played a critical role in the development of high performance HgCdTe infrared detectors that have enabled a generation of scientific facilities, including the Hubble Space Telescope, WISE, the Mars Reconnaissance Orbiter and New Horizons. || 
|-id=350
| 454350 Paolaamico ||  || Paola Amico (born 1964) is a systems engineer at the European Southern Observatory. She has been a key member of teams that have developed and installed detector systems and instrumentation at the world's largest ground-based telescopes, including ESO's Very Large Telescope and the W. M. Keck Observatory. || 
|-id=352
| 454352 Majidzandian ||  || Majid Zandian (born 1962) is a material scientist at Teledyne Imaging Sensors who has played a critical role in the development of high performance HgCdTe infrared detectors that have enabled a generation of scientific facilities, including the Hubble Space Telescope, WISE, the Mars Reconnaissance Orbiter and New Horizons. || 
|}

454401–454500 

|-id=409
| 454409 Markusloose ||  || Markus Loose (born 1970), an electrical engineer, has played a central role in the development of low noise infrared detector electronics that have enabled a new generation of astronomical instrumentation. His electronics have been used in numerous ground- and space-based telescopes, including the Hubble Space Telescope and WISE || 
|-id=419
| 454419 Hansklausreif ||  || Hans-Klaus Reif (born 1949) has built very large high-precision shutters that are used with CCD cameras at ground-based observatories around the world. His shutters enable large cameras in telescopes at La Palma, Kitt Peak, Haleakala, Paranal and Palomar Observatory. || 
|}

454501–454600 

|-id=505
| 454505 Suntharalingam ||  || Vyshnavi Suntharalingam (born 1968) has led the development of advanced visible CCD and CMOS detectors at MIT Lincoln Laboratory. She has helped create larger format devices that can be assembled into mosaics. || 
|}

454601–454700 

|-bgcolor=#f2f2f2
| colspan=4 align=center | 
|}

454701–454800 

|-bgcolor=#f2f2f2
| colspan=4 align=center | 
|}

454801–454900 

|-bgcolor=#f2f2f2
| colspan=4 align=center | 
|}

454901–455000 

|-bgcolor=#f2f2f2
| colspan=4 align=center | 
|}

References 

454001-455000